Henry Ferdinand Mudge (known as Henk) (born February 18, 1952) is a Namibian politician and President of the Republican Party. He was the party's only member of the National Assembly of Namibia from 2004 to 2011, when he resigned.

Life and career
Mudge, a White Namibian, was born in Otjiwarongo, Otjozondjupa; he is the son of Republican Party founder Dirk Mudge. The younger Mudge was a founding member of the Republican Party in 1977; the party joined the Democratic Turnhalle Alliance (DTA) in the same year, and Mudge held a seat on the Khomas Regional Council from 1992 to 2003 as a member of the DTA, representing Windhoek West constituency. In mid-2003 Mudge launched an effort to revive the Republican Party as an independent organization, and he resigned from the Regional Council on June 30, 2003. DTA President Katuutire Kaura denounced Mudge's move to separate the Republican Party from the DTA, saying that Mudge acted unilaterally and illegally, and he said that Mudge had "expelled himself" from the DTA through his actions. Kaura claimed that Mudge wanted to create a party solely for "previously advantaged" minority Namibians. Mudge became the President of the Republican Party, as well as a member of its National Executive Committee, in 2003.

In the November 2004 parliamentary election, he was elected to the National Assembly; he also stood as the Republican Party's candidate in the presidential election, receiving 1.95% of the vote.

In the November 2009 parliamentary election, Mudge was re-elected to the National Assembly as the party's only representative. In the concurrent presidential election, Mudge  received 1.16% of the vote, placing seventh out of 12 candidates. In September 2010, Mudge and eight other opposition politicians were sworn-in as members of the National Assembly following a six-month boycott due to electoral irregularities in the 2009 election.

In March 2011, Mudge resigned as both a member of the National Assembly and as the President of the Republican Party. The party appointed Clara Gowases, who was ranked second on the party's electoral list in the 2009 election, to replace him. He nevertheless remained in the post of party president. On 9 January 2013 Mudge declared his party's support for Hage Geingob in the 2014 presidential election. Mudge was re-elected as President of the Republican Party at a party congress in July 2014. He was elected to the National Assembly in the November 2014 parliamentary election, again as his party's only representative.

References

1952 births
Living people
People from Otjiwarongo
Popular Democratic Movement politicians
Members of the National Assembly (Namibia)
Namibian people of South African descent
White Namibian people
Republican Party (Namibia) politicians
Candidates for President of Namibia